Alexandra Halt railway station, or simply Alexandra Halt, was a railway station on the Singapore-Johore Railway which served the surrounding neighbourhoods, and as a halt for trains travelling along the railway, from 3 May 1932 to sometime before 1943.

History
As it was decided that Tank Road station was unfit to be the terminus of the line, it was decided that the Bukit Timah-Tank Road section of the line would be abandoned, and the line would instead deviate in between Bukit Panjang station and Bukit Timah station, travelling down a different route which ran along the west of the main town, to a new terminal station at Tanjong Pagar, with a new station being built at Bukit Timah, and two new stations at Tanglin and Alexandra. Alexandra Halt railway station was opened to the public on 3 May 1932 as one of four new stations on the new route of the Singapore-Kranji railway, along Alexandra Road. Besides being a stopping place for trains travelling on the railway, the station also serviced the areas surrounding the Alexandra Barracks.

The station was abandoned and demolished by 1943, likely due to the fact the Tanglin station had instead replaced Alexandra Halt as a halt on the railway line.

Routes

References

Railway stations in Singapore opened in 1932
Defunct railway stations in Singapore